Winfred Édouard Tereori Fritch (born 4 January 1952) is a French politician who has served as President of French Polynesia since 2014. He previously presided over the Assembly of French Polynesia on three occasions: from April 2007 to February 2008, from February 2009 to April 2009 and from May 2013 to September 2014. Until 2015, Fritch was co-president of Tahoera'a Huiraatira, a pro-French political party, before he became president of the newly-established Tapura Huiraatira.

He became a member of the Assembly of French Polynesia in 1986. He was reelected in 1991, 1996, 2001, 2004, 2008 and 2013. He served as a cabinet minister in French Polynesia several times between 1984 and 2011. From 1996 to 2004, from 2004 to 2005, in 2008 and again from 2009 to 2011, he served as Vice President of French Polynesia under his father-in-law Gaston Flosse. From 2000 to 2008, he was Mayor of Pirae, where he succeeded Flosse. He lost the 2008 election, but remained a municipal councillor. He was subsequently reelected to the mayorship in 2014.

Career
Born in Papeete, Fritch graduated from the École des ingénieurs de la Ville de Paris. He came back from metropolitan France in 1980 to work for the commune of Pirae.

2004 French Polynesian legislative election

2008 French Polynesian legislative election

The 2008 French Polynesian legislative election took place on January 27, 2008, and February 10, 2008. The pro-French political of former President Gaston Tong Sang, O Porinetia To Tatou Ai'a, secured 27 of the 57 seats in the new French Polynesian Assembly. Fritch's Tahoeraa Huiraatira party won 10 seats.

Negotiations between Fritch and Tong Sang reportedly broke down earlier in the week of February 17. Tong Sang said that he was prepared to offer Fritch's Tahoeraa Huiraatira party the Speaker of the Assembly, as well as 4 of the 15 ministerial posts, should he form a new government. Fritch refused Tong Sang's offer, saying that he wanted no less than five ministerial positions.

However, the two sides finally reached an eleventh-hour deal between Tong Sang's O Porinetia To Tatou Ai'a party and the Tahoeraa Huiraatira to form a new pro-French coalition in the Assembly. On Thursday, February 21, 2008, Tong Sang announced that he had offered Fritch's Tahoeraa Huiraatira five ministerial positions, which Fritch had wanted, plus the Speakership of the Assembly and the chairmanships of three parliamentary committees.

Fritch was re-elected as the President of the Assembly inaugural sitting of the new 2008 legislative assembly following the political deal. Fritch was re-elected with a total of 36 votes while pro-independence candidate Antony Géros came in second with 21 votes. 

He served as Speaker for only two months under Gaston Flosse in 2008 until Gaston Tong Sang was elected president in April 2008.

2009 French Polynesian presidential election

Fritch stood as a candidate for President of French Polynesia for the Tahoera'a Huiraatira party in the 2009 French Polynesian presidential election. However, he failed to garner enough votes, coming in third place to Oscar Temaru.

Fritch was once again elected as the President of the Assembly of French Polynesia on February 12, 2009. His election as Speaker was part of the coalition agreement which allowed Oscar Temaru to be elected president the day before. Fritch was elected with the support of 38 of the 57 members of the Assembly.

On April 9, 2009, a second election was held for President of the Assembly following a reshuffling of the government. Former President Gaston Tong Sang had moved to join the ruling coalition of President Oscar Temaru. Fritch initially resisted calls for a new election, saying that his position was necessary for the current April 9 Assembly session. However, a new election was held following legal advice from the French Council of State in Paris.

Fritch was defeated by Philip Schyle in the election on Thursday morning, April 9, 2009. Schyle, a member of the O Porinetia To Tatou Ai'a, received 40 votes, while Fritch garnered obtained just 14 votes. One Assembly member did not vote and there were two blank ballots. Schyle immediately became the new Speaker.

In a speech following his ouster as President, Fritch expressed "disappointment" that the  UPLD-Tahoeraa political alliance was in trouble. He called the timing of the election unfortunate "in a time of economic crisis." He also accused the new alliance between President Temaru and former President Gaston Tong Sang as being inspired by French President Nicolas Sarkozy.

On 1 March 2011 he was sacked as Vice-President from the Cabinet of Gaston Tong Sang for failing to support the budget.

2012 French legislative election

Fritch was elected on 16 June 2012 as member of the National Assembly of France in the 1st constituency of French Polynesia. He seated in the Union for Democrats and Independents group in the National Assembly, chaired by former minister Jean-Louis Borloo. He resigned in April 2014 because of a new law preventing cumulative mandates.

2013 French Polynesian legislative election

2014 French Polynesian presidential election

2018 French Polynesian presidential election

Honours and decorations

Territorial honours

Foreign nongovernmental organizations

See also 
President of French Polynesia
Assembly of French Polynesia
Tapura Huiraatira
Order of Tahiti Nui

References 

1952 births
Living people
Presidents of French Polynesia
Speakers of the Assembly of French Polynesia
Members of the Assembly of French Polynesia
French Polynesian engineers
Tahoera'a Huiraatira politicians
People from Papeete
Deputies of the 14th National Assembly of the French Fifth Republic
Recipients of the Order of Tahiti Nui